Nikolina Vukčević (born 28 July 2000) is a Montenegrin handball player for ŽRK Budućnost Podgorica and the Montenegrin national team.

She represented Montenegro at the 2020 European Women's Handball Championship.

Achievements
Montenegrin Championship:
Winner: 2018, 2019, 2021
Montenegrin Cup:
Winner: 2018, 2019, 2020, 2021
Women's Regional Handball League:
Winner: 2019

References

External links

2000 births
Living people
Montenegrin female handball players
Sportspeople from Podgorica
Olympic handball players of Montenegro
Handball players at the 2020 Summer Olympics
Mediterranean Games silver medalists for Montenegro
Mediterranean Games medalists in handball
Competitors at the 2018 Mediterranean Games